Capupa is an Angolan commune. It belongs to the municipality of Cubal, in the province of Benguela.

References 

Populated places in Benguela Province
Municipalities of Angola